Balala may refer to:

Balala the Fairies
Balala the Fairies, Chinese magical girl metaseries created and produced by Alpha Group
Balala the Fairies: The Movie, 2013 live-action adaptation of the animated series
Balala the Fairies: The Magic Trial, 2014 live-action adaptation of the animated series
Balala the Fairies: Princess Camellia, 2015 live-action adaptation of the animated series

People
Ahmed bin Abdullah Balala (born 1967), Indian politician
Najib Balala (born 1967), Kenyan politician
Viktor Balala (born 1961), Transnistrian politician

See also
Balala Hakkula Sangham, an Indian community opposing child marriage, sexual abuse and child labour